Paul Bennett (born 30 January 1961) is an English former footballer who played in the Football League for Port Vale.

Career
Bennett was an Everton youth team player before joining Port Vale in September 1978. He made his debut as a substitute in a 1–1 draw with Peterborough United at London Road on 1 November 1980, and three weeks later he scored his first goal in a 4–2 win over Bradford City. He went on to play 26 Fourth Division games in the 1980–81 season, and scored his first goal in the Football League from the penalty spot in a 2–0 win over York City at Vale Park on 7 March. However, he then fell out of favour under manager John McGrath and played just four league games the following season and was given a free transfer in May 1982. He then moved on to Alliance Premier League club Northwich Victoria (in two spells), Telford United, Buxton (Northern Premier League) and Stalybridge Celtic.

Bennett joined Stalybridge Celtic in July 1989 and made 12 appearances in the 1990–91 season as Celtic finished runners-up in the Northern Premier League Premier Division. He made 53 appearances in the 1991–92 campaign, scoring four goals, as the club secured promotion as champions of the Northern Premier League; he also played in the President's Cup with a 2–1 defeat to Morecambe. He played 45 games in the 1992–93 season as Celtic finished mid-table in the Conference. He played 39 games in the 1993–94 season, scoring one goal. He retied after featuring 15 times in the 1994–95 campaign.

Career statistics
Source:

Honours
Stalybridge Celtic'
Northern Premier League Premier Division: 1991–92
Northern Premier League President's Cup runners-up: 1992

References

1961 births
Living people
Footballers from Liverpool
English footballers
Association football midfielders
Everton F.C. players
Port Vale F.C. players
Northwich Victoria F.C. players
Telford United F.C. players
Buxton F.C. players
Stalybridge Celtic F.C. players
English Football League players
National League (English football) players
Northern Premier League players